Karun Thapa (Nepali: करुण थापा) born on 23 March 1965) is a Nepali IT expert, film editor, 3D animator, trainer, a well-known lyricist and Ghazal writer. Karun is known for his technological contribution to Nepali IT and media industry. He has contributed by introducing Devanagari fonts in computers, introducing AVID Digital Film Editing system in Nepal and introducing 3D animation in Nepal.

Early life and education 
Karun Thapa was born in 1965 (BS 2022) in Beni to a Hindu family. Karun studied till class 3 in his village school called Dhaulagiri School. He stood first in Myagdi district in a scholarship exam, got scholarship and went to Budhanilkantha School in Kathmandu. After completing high school from Budhanilkantha School, Karun went to Amrit Science College (ASCOL) to complete his intermediate in science and graduation in Computer Science from Priyadarshini College.

Career 
Karun Thapa started his career a software developer and a computer trainer. He started making business software for hotels, banks, business companies, etc. and started a computer training institute in 1988.

Thapa was the first person to develop Nepali (Devanagari) font on Apple IIe and Apple Macintosh computers. UNESCO nominated Thapa to participate in the Asian Federation of Natural Language Processing (AIT, Bangkok) 1992 and the Asia Pacific Regional Seminar on Information Technology and Newspaper Publishing in Madras (from 11–14 April 1995) in recognition to the font development done by him. He also developed Limbu (Srijunga) Script and Rai (Wambule Script) in 1994. He is mentioned in the history section in a book called History, Culture and Customs of Sikkim (J. R. Subba). Thapa introduced 3D animation in Nepal and he is the first 3D animator in Nepal.

Karun Introduced AVID film editing and digital cinema in Nepal.

Filmography

Awards

Winner

Achievements

Honours

Served as Jury Member

Jury Member for the following

References

External links 
 
 

Thapa, Karun
1965 births
Nepalese film editors
People from Myagdi District